General Insurance Corporation of India Limited, abbreviated as GIC Re, is a central public sector undertaking under the ownership of Ministry of Finance, Government of India. It has its registered office and headquarters in Mumbai. It was incorporated on 22 November 1972 under Companies Act, 1956. It was the sole government-owned-reinsurer in the Indian insurance market until the insurance market was open to foreign reinsurance players by late 2016 including companies from Germany, Switzerland and France. GIC Re's shares are listed on BSE Limited and National Stock Exchange of India Ltd.

Making of GIC  

The business of general insurance was nationalised through The General Insurance (Emergency) Provisions Ordinance promulgated on 13 May 1971 and thereby the business being carried on by 107 entities was consolidated and restructured into four companies namely The New India Assurance Company Limited, Bombay, United India Fire & General Insurance Company Limited, Madras, Oriental Fire & General Insurance Company Limited, Bombay and National Insurance Company Limited, Calcutta (New India Assurance Co. Ltd., United India Insurance Co. Ltd., The Oriental Insurance Co. Ltd., and National Insurance Company Co. Ltd. respectively).

The General Insurance Business (Nationalisation) Act, 1972 (GIBNA) that followed paved the way for the Government to take over ownership of these businesses. Accordingly, GIC was incorporated on 22 November 1972 as a private company under Companies Act, 1956 in Bombay and received its Certificate for Commencement of Business on 1 January 1973.

GIC's stated role was to function as the holding company of the four companies, and superintend, control and carry on the business of General insurance on behalf of the Government of India.

The first Chairman of GIC was A Rajagopalan, an Actuary and an officer of the Indian Administrative Service (IAS). M K Venkateshan and S K Desai were appointed the two Managing Directors of GIC.

On 1 January 1973, GIC was notified as the reinsurer under Section 101 A of Insurance Act, 1938, making it the Indian reinsurer for receiving obligatory cessions, a role hitherto played by two companies called India Reinsurance Corporation Limited (India Re) and Indian Guarantee and General Insurance Company Limited (Indian Guarantee).

GIC was reborn as a pure reinsurance company in November, 2000. It was re-notified as 'Indian reinsurer' under Insurance Act, 1938 and continued to receive obligatory cessions from direct insurers. It continued writing foreign inward reinsurance business purely on its own account from 1 April 2002.

With effect from 21 March 2003, its four subsidiaries (NICL, United India Insurance, Oriental Insurance and New India Assurance) were delinked from GIC by an administrative order from the Ministry of Finance and became directly owned by the Government.

Retaining its name, the company rebranded itself as "GIC Re" to denote its new identity.

Operations 
All direct general insurance companies of India are required by law to cede a mandatory percentage of every policy value to GIC Re subject to some limitations and exceptions. This percentage of cession is decided by the IRDAI on an annual basis.

In April 2020, GIC Re's Operations in Brazil got status upgrade from 'occasional reinsurer' to 'admitted reinsurer' by the Brazilian Superintendence of Private Insurance (SUSEP). It was published in the Brazilian Gazette on 14 April 2020.

Motto & Logo 

On 26 August 1976, Chairman A Rajagopalan in GIC's Board Minutes signed and approved the motto of GIC Re, Ãpatkãle Rakshisyãmi. It a Sanskrit phrase that translates into, "I shall protect you in times of distress." In 1980s, GIC's logo was modified and the motto was incorporated in Devanagari Script.

Suraksha 

At the time of its creation, GIC was headquartered in the fourth floor of Industrial Assurance Building owned by LIC.

GIC acquired Jeevan Kendra that belonged to LIC and housed its Bombay Zonal Office. It was extensively renovated retaining its curved front and then gilded with panels of reflective glass. It has a circular atrium running the height of the building.

This building was eventually named as 'Suraksha,’ meaning protection.

Suraksha became the Registered and Head Office of GIC, and all its departments moved in from their various locations in March, 1992.

Leadership

Board 

As of 2022, GIC Re's Board of Director consists of Mr. Devesh Srivastava (Chairman-and-Managing Director), Mr. A K Das (MD and CEO, BOI), Mr. V Ramasamy (Independent Director), Mr. Amarendra Pratap Singh (Independent Director), Mr. G B Pande (Independent Director), Ms. Dakshita Das (Additional Secretary, DFS), and Ms. A Manimekhalai (Executive Director, Canara Bank).

Executives 

Mr. Devesh Srivastava is the currently appointed Chairman- and- Managing Director of GIC Re. GIC Re's various line of business are headed by the General Managers namely Ms. Reena Bhatnagar, Mr. Deepak Prasad, Ms. Madhulika Bhaskar, Mr. Sashikant More, Ms. Suchita Gupta, and Mr. S L Tripathy.

Employee Strength 

As on 31 March 2020, there are 568 employees in GIC Re (including liaison offices and foreign branches). Out of these, 198 are female employees.

Subsidiaries

GIC Re South Africa Ltd 
GIC Re South Africa Ltd is a 100% owned subsidiary of GIC Re. It was established by acquiring South African composite reinsurer Saxum Re in 2014 to cater to Reinsurance needs of Africa continent, especially South Africa. The company underwrites business from the entire African continent except Egypt and Libya.

GIC Perestrakhovanie LLC, Russia 
GIC Perestrakhovanie LLC, Russia is a 100% subsidiary of GIC Re which was established on 14 November 2018 and was licensed on 30 January 2020 to transact reinsurance business. The remit of the subsidiary is to write business in all classes of reinsurance emanating from Russia and former Soviet Union countries, namely, Armenia, Azerbaijan, Belarus, Georgia, Kazakhstan, Kyrgyzstan, Moldova, Tajikistan, Turkmenistan, Ukraine, Uzbekistan.

GIC Re, India, Corporate Member Ltd 
As part of its global business outlook, GIC Re has been providing capacity to Lloyd's syndicates through quota share capital gearing treaties since 2011. As a capacity provider, since GIC Re was required to have its own Corporate Membership at Lloyd's, GIC Re acquired I-CAT CCM TEN Ltd, an existing Corporate Member company, in December 2013 and renamed it as GIC Re, India, Corporate Member Ltd, which is registered as a private limited company in the UK and 100% owned subsidiary of GIC Re. The acquisition has the approval of the Ministry and IRDA.

GIC Housing Finance 

GIC Housing Finance Limited, was incorporated as 'GIC Grih Vitta Limited' on 12 December 1989. The name was changed to its present name vide a fresh Certificate of Incorporation issued on 16 November 1993. The primary business of GICHFL is granting housing loans to individuals and to persons/entities engaged in construction of houses/flats for residential purposes.

The company is promoted by General Insurance Corporation of India and its erstwhile subsidiaries namely, National Insurance Company Limited, The New India Assurance Company Limited, The Oriental Insurance Company Limited and United India Insurance Company Limited.

Reinsurance Pools 

Pooling arrangements have been used worldwide as alternative risk transfer mechanism in insurance sector majorly for high severity low frequency risks wherein conventional products fail on price variability. An insurance pool is a multiple member, risk sharing arrangement where organisation pool their funds together to finance an exposure, liability, risk or some combination of three.

GIC Re is manager for Indian Market Terrorism Risk Insurance Pool (IMTRIP), The FAIR Natural Catastrophe Reinsurance Pool (FNCRIP) and India Nuclear Insurance Pool (INIP).

Indian Market Terrorism Risk Insurance Pool (IMTRIP) 

IMTRIP was formed in April 2002 as an initiative by all the non-life insurance companies in India in the aftermath of withdrawal of insurance and reinsurance capacity for terrorism risk in the international market, after the 9/11 incident.  The Pool has now completed 18 years of successful operation and continuing to provide automatic capacity to the domestic insurance companies for covering terrorism risk. All non-life insurance companies operating in India including GIC Re are members of the Pool. The present membership strength of the Pool is 26. The Pool enables members/non-life insurance companies to provide insurance cover against terrorism risk in India on the combined underwriting capacity of the members.

The FAIR Natural Catastrophe Reinsurance Pool (FNCRIP) 

FNCRIP was formed under the ambit of FAIR (Federation of Afro-Asian Insurers and Reinsurers) to meet the reinsurance requirements of insurers in the Afro-Asian region for natural catastrophe covers in the backdrop of increased frequency and severity of natural catastrophe events in the region. FNCRIP was launched in September 2013 during the 23rd FAIR Conference held in Beijing and is operational since 1 January 2014. The pool is backed by 13 strong regional insurers and reinsurers with good rating among which some are Government owned as well.

India Nuclear Insurance Pool (INIP) 

INIP was formed in view of the enactment of Civil Liability for Nuclear Damage Act, 2010, as an initiative of GIC Re along with other domestic non-life Insurance companies by pooling the capacity to provide insurance covers for nuclear risks. The Pool was launched on 12 June 2015 with the total capacity of INR 1500 Crores. The Pool enables coverage for Nuclear Operators and Nuclear Suppliers against nuclear liability arising out of Civil Liability for Nuclear Damage Act, 2010 in India.

References

External links
 

Financial services companies based in Mumbai
General insurance companies of India
Financial services companies established in 1972
Government-owned insurance companies of India
Companies nationalised by the Government of India
Indian brands
1972 establishments in Maharashtra
Indian companies established in 1972
Companies listed on the National Stock Exchange of India
Companies listed on the Bombay Stock Exchange